Copford is a village and civil parish in Essex, England,  west of Colchester. The hamlet of Copford Green is found a short distance to the south.  The poet Matthew Arnold noted he was struck by "the deeply rural character of the village and neighbourhood."

History

Copford was originally a manor held by the Bishop of London's office. Upon the death of Edmund Bonner in 1569 (also buried here) the land briefly became property of The Crown until 1609 when it returned to private ownership once more . The parish church of St Michael is renowned for its 12th-century Norman wall paintings that are among the best in England. The church door has been found to have human skin attached, possibly as a gruesome remnant of the ancient punishment meted out to those who invaded the sanctity of the church. Adjacent to the church is the manorial house of Copford Hall.

Governance
Copford is part of the electoral ward called Copford and West Stanway. The population of this ward at the 2011 Census was 1,915.

Transport
Copford is situated about half a mile east of the junction between the A12 and A120 at Marks Tey.

The closest rail link is the Great Eastern Main Line, which connects London Liverpool Street to Norwich, and stops at Marks Tey station.

The village is served by the 70 and 71 bus services at the London Road end, thus giving access to Colchester, Chelmsford and Braintree via public transport.

Copford Green and the neighbouring village of Easthorpe are served every Wednesday by a community bus for which tickets must be purchased in advance.

Community
Copford is divided into 3 distinct areas of population, the largest of which is the Queensberry Avenue Estate with some 250 houses. London Road/School Road (down to the Village Hall) has approx. 190 dwellings, and the Copford Green area a further 150.

The village has a Hall built in the early 1990s, and a School parts of which date back to Victorian times, and the majority of which was rebuilt with the addition of a new School Hall in 2002.

The Parish Council owns two play parks (one behind the Village Hall, the other on Queensberry Avenue), and woods complete with a picnic area and several walks.

Notable people
Benjamin Lay, American abolitionist and Quaker

References

External links

History of the Parish of Copford
Copford at Streetmap.co.uk

Villages in Essex
Borough of Colchester